Nathaniel Carl "Nat" Goodwin (July 25, 1857 – January 31, 1919) was an American actor and vaudevillian born in Boston.

Life and career
While clerk in a large shop Goodwin studied for the stage and made his first appearance in 1874 at the Howard Athenaeum in Boston in Stuart Robson's company as the newsboy in Joseph Bradford's Law in New York. The next year he appeared at Tony Pastor's Opera House in New York City where he began his career as a vaudevillian.

In 1876, he appeared at the New York Lyceum in Off the Stage where he imitated a number of popular actors of the period.

In 1878, he co-founded the Boston Elks Lodge, and his association with the lodge, and that of his manager in the 1880s, George W. Floyd (né George Wood Floyd; 1853–1923), would change baseball history, giving us arguably the first role of an agent in baseball history. Floyd, in particular, would serve as a go-between, starting in 1887, between the management of the Boston National League club, the Beaneaters, and its newly signed star, Mike "King" Kelly. In 1889, Goodwin became a member of the governing committee of the newly created Actors' Amateur Athletic Association of America.

When Kelly and his Chicago teammates won the pennant in 1885, Goodwin and Floyd treated the Chicago team to a performance of "The Skating Rink" at Hooley’s Theatre in Chicago. "After the overture the orchestra struck up 'See, the Conquering Hero Comes,' and Mr. Floyd conducted the eleven Chicago players to their boxes," Chicago captain-manager Cap Anson in the lead."   After the first act, Goodwin presented Anson with a "solid silver facsimile of a League ball."

A hit in the Victorian burlesque Black-eyed Susan led to Goodwin's taking part in Edward E. Rice and J. Cheever Goodwin's Evangeline company in 1874. It was not until 1889, however, that Nat Goodwin's talent as a comedian of the legitimate type began to be recognized. From that time he appeared in a number of plays designed to display his drily humorous method, such as Brander Matthews' and George H. Jessop's A Gold Mine, Henry Guy Carleton's A Gilded Fool and Ambition, Henry V. Esmond's When We Were Twenty-one, and others. He also found success in more serious works such as Augustus Thomas's In Mizzoura and Clyde Fitch's Nathan Hale. 

A chance trip to Goldfield, Nevada to witness a prize fight led to Goodwin's involvement in promoting mining stocks in association with George Graham Rice. Goodwin quit his partnership with Rice shortly before the latter was arrested for mail fraud.

Perhaps Goodwin's most famous role was as Fagin in a 1912 stage adaptation of Dickens' Oliver Twist in which he appeared with Marie Doro and Constance Collier. He reprised this role for a film which still survives and is preserved in the Library of 
Congress. He acted in a handful of films between 1912 and 1916.

Goodwin owned a cafe and cabaret, "Cafe Nat Goodwin", on the private Bristol Pier in Santa Monica, California between 1913 and 1916.  After he sold the business in 1916, its name was changed to the Sunset Inn.

Personal life 

In 1877, he married Eliza Weathersby (d. 1887), an English actress with whom he played for two seasons in Benjamin E. Woolf's Hobbies. 
Goodwin remarried to an actress named Nella Baker Pease (married in 1890, divorced on Jan. 19, 1898). Until 1903 he was associated in his performances with his third wife, the actress Maxine Elliott (born 1868), whom he married in 1898; this marriage was dissolved in 1908. 

From 1905 to 1910, he partnered with Edna Goodrich in a string of comedy hits — they were married from 1908 to 1911. His last wife was the actress Margaret Moreland (married in 1912, divorced in 1918). When he died he was said to have been engaged to the actress Georgia Gardner.

Death 
He died in New York City, at the Claridge Hotel, from shock two weeks after having his right eye removed and was buried at Milton Cemetery in Milton, Massachusetts. He was survived by both of his parents. At the time of his death, he was deeply in debt, with his estate listing assets of $6,895 and debts of $15,000.

Filmography

Oliver Twist (1912)
The Master Hand (1915)
Business is Business (1915)
The Marriage Bond (1916)
A Wall Street Tragedy (1916)

Publications
 Winter, The Wallet of Time, New York: Benjamin Blom, Inc. (1913); 
 Strang (né Lewis Clinton Strang; 1869–1935), Famous Actors of the Day, in America, (Boston, 1900); 
 McKay (Frederic Edward McKay) and Wingate (Charles E. L. Wingate), Famous American Actors of To-Day, Thomas Y. Crowell Co. (1896); 
 Nat Goodwin's Book (autobiography), by Nathaniel Carl Goodwin, (Boston, 1914), Boston: R.G. Badger (publisher) (Richard Gorham Badger; 1877–1937);

Notes and references

Notes

General references 

Hartnoll, Phyllis (ed.), The Oxford Companion to the Theatre (4th ed.) (Oxford Companions), Oxford University Press (1985), p. 342; 
Rosenberg, Howard W., [http://www.capanson.com/cap_anson_books.html Cap Anson 2: The Theatrical and Kingly Mike Kelly: U.S. Team Sport's First Media Sensation and Baseball's Original Casey at the Bat], Arlington, Virginia: Tile Books (2004);

Inline citations

External links

 
 
 
 Nat C. Goodwin
 

American male comedians
Male actors from Boston
American male stage actors
American male film actors
American male silent film actors
20th-century American male actors
1857 births
1919 deaths
Vaudeville performers
American sports agents
20th-century American comedians
19th-century American businesspeople